A plebiscite on the amendment to the Constitution of the Philippines pursuant to resolution of the dated November 3, 1939, setting up export tariffs for goods such as sugar. This occurred on October 24, 1939.

Results

See also
Commission on Elections
Politics of the Philippines
Philippine elections
Trade agreement

References

External links
 Official website of the Commission on Elections

Tax reform referendums
1939 in the Philippines
1939 referendums
Constitutional referendums in the Philippines
Presidency of Manuel L. Quezon